Millennium 1990-2000 is the second compilation album and the seventh overall album released by Pakistani rock band, Junoon. It was released in 2000. The album features some best songs of band. It also includes two live versions of "Allah Hu", "Lal Meri Pat". It includes emotive song "Azadi" from the movie based on the life of Quaid-e-Azam Mohammad Ali Jinnah, the founder of Pakistan. The song is a tribute to Jinnah and his work towards the creation of Pakistan. "Azadi" is followed by Neend Ati Nhin one of Junoon's early hits. It also features sufi songs such as Ghoom which has an emotive guitar solo and emotive vocals. It has Junoon's patriotic song Jazba-e-Junoon which was released as single for the 1996 Cricket World Cup. Released in 2000 album was received well in Pakistan.

Track listings 
All music written & composed by Salman Ahmad and Sabir Zafar.

 Azadi (For "JINNAH" The Movie) 
 Neend Aati Nahin   
 Maine Kabhi
 Khwab
 Rooh Ki Pyaas
 Mahi
 Jazba-e-Junoon
 Muk Gay Nay
 Ghoom
 Sajna
 Yaar Bina
 Lal Meri Pat (Live)
 Allah Hu (Live)

The Videos 1990–2000

Junoon released a similar album in the year 2000 to celebrate their 10th anniversary as a band. The Videos 1990-2000 is the third compilation album and the eighth overall album of the band. The album contains the music videos of all the songs, present in Millennium 1990–2000.

External links
 Junoon Official Website

Junoon (band) compilation albums
Junoon (band) video albums
2000 compilation albums
2000 video albums
Music video compilation albums
Urdu-language albums